Caloptilia betulicola, the red birch slender, is a moth of the family Gracillariidae. It is found from Scandinavia and the north of European Russia to the Pyrenees and Alps and from Ireland to Poland and Slovakia. In the east it is found up to China, Japan and the Russian Far East.

The wingspan is .The moth has yellow marked orange brown forewings or almost unicolorous yellow. It is, then, similar to Caloptilia elongella and Caloptilia hemidactylella. There are two generations per year, with adults on wing in June and July and again in September and October.

The larvae feed on Betula pendula and Betula pubecens. They mine the leaves of their host plant. The mine starts with an inconspicuous epidermal corridor. Later, a blotch is formed, that quickly develops into a tentiform mine. Generally, the mine is lower-surface, but upper-surface mines are not rare. The frass is deposited in a mass of grains in a corner of the mine. After leaving the mine, the larva moves twice. First it lives in a rolled or folded leaf margin and later in a leaf that is rolled downwards, starting from the leaf tip. Pupation takes place in a white, shining, parchment-like cocoon, that is attached to the leaf margin with silk.

References

External links
Lepiforum.de

betulicola
Moths described in 1928
Moths of Europe
Moths of Asia